The Fourth K is a novel by Mario Puzo, published in 1990.  It is set during the  Presidency of fictional "Francis Xavier Kennedy," nephew of John F., Robert F. and Ted Kennedy.

Plot summary 
President Francis Xavier Kennedy is elected to office, in large part, thanks to the legacy of his forebears–good looks, privilege, wealth–and is the very embodiment of youthful optimism. Too soon, however, he is beaten down by the political process and, disabused of his ideals, becomes a leader totally unlike what he has been before.

When his daughter becomes a pawn in a brutal terrorist plot, Kennedy, who has obsessively kept alive the memory of his uncles’ assassinations, activates all his power to retaliate in a series of violent measures. As the explosive events unfold, the world and those closest to him look on with both awe and horror.  

Mario Puzo has stated: "The Fourth K was a [commercial] failure—but it was my most ambitious book."

See also

Kennedy family

References

1990 novels
Novels by Mario Puzo
American political novels
Novels about terrorism
Kennedy family
Future history
fr:Le Quatrième K